In theoretical physics, Lovelock's theory of gravity (often referred to as Lovelock gravity) is a generalization of Einstein's theory of general relativity introduced by David Lovelock in 1971. It is the most general metric theory of gravity yielding conserved second order equations of motion in an arbitrary number of spacetime dimensions D. In this sense, Lovelock's theory is the natural generalization of Einstein's General Relativity to higher dimensions. In three and four dimensions (D = 3, 4), Lovelock's theory coincides with Einstein's theory, but in higher dimensions the theories are different. In fact, for D > 4 Einstein gravity can be thought of as a particular case of Lovelock gravity since the Einstein–Hilbert action is one of several terms that constitute the Lovelock action.

Lagrangian density

The Lagrangian of the theory is given by a sum of dimensionally extended
Euler densities, and it can be written as follows

where Rμναβ represents the Riemann tensor, and where the generalized Kronecker delta δ is defined as the antisymmetric product

Each term  in  corresponds to the dimensional extension of the Euler density in 2n dimensions, so that these only contribute to the equations of motion for n < D/2.

Coupling constants

The coupling constants αn in the Lagrangian  have dimensions of [length]2n − D, although it is usual to normalize the Lagrangian density in units of the Planck scale

where one sees that coupling α0 corresponds to the cosmological constant Λ, while αn with n ≥ 2 are coupling constants of additional terms that represent ultraviolet corrections to Einstein theory, involving higher order contractions of the Riemann tensor Rμναβ. In particular, the second order term

is precisely the quadratic Gauss–Bonnet term, which is the dimensionally extended version of the four-dimensional Euler density.

Equations of motion
By noting that 

is a topological constant, we can eliminate the Riemann tensor term and thus we can put the Lovelock Lagrangian into the form

which has the equations of motion

Other contexts

Because Lovelock action contains, among others, the quadratic Gauss–Bonnet term (i.e. the four-dimensional Euler characteristic extended to D dimensions), it is usually said that Lovelock theory resembles string-theory-inspired models of gravity. This is because a quadratic term is present in the low energy effective action of heterotic string theory, and it also appears in six-dimensional Calabi–Yau compactifications of M-theory. In the mid 1980s, a decade after Lovelock proposed his generalization of the Einstein tensor, physicists began to discuss the quadratic Gauss–Bonnet term within the context of string theory, with particular attention to its property of being ghost-free in Minkowski space. The theory is known to be free of ghosts about other exact backgrounds as well, e.g. about one of the branches of the spherically symmetric solution found by Boulware and Deser in 1985. In general, Lovelock's theory represents a very interesting scenario to study how the physics of gravity is corrected at short distance due to the presence of higher order curvature terms in the action, and in the mid-2000s the theory was considered as a testing ground to investigate the effects of introducing higher-curvature terms in the context of AdS/CFT correspondence.

See also 
 Lovelock's theorem
 f(R) gravity
 Gauss–Bonnet gravity
 Curtright field

Notes

References 

 .
 

Theories of gravity
String theory
Spacetime